Joanna Ignasiak (born 14 October 1983) is a road cyclist from Poland. She represented her nation at the 2003 UCI Road World Championships. In 2007, she won the Polish National Time Trial Championships.

References

External links
 profile at Procyclingstats.com

1983 births
Polish female cyclists
Living people
Place of birth missing (living people)